Frederick I. Thompson (September 29, 1875 – February 20, 1952) was an American businessman who served as a Commissioner of the Federal Communications Commission from 1939 to 1941.

References

1875 births
1952 deaths
Members of the Federal Communications Commission
Alabama Democrats
Franklin D. Roosevelt administration personnel